Britton–Robinson buffer (aka BRB aka PEM) is a "universal" pH buffer used for the pH range from 2 to 12. Universal buffers consist of mixtures of acids of diminishing strength (increasing pKa), so that the change in pH is approximately proportional to the amount of alkali added. It consists of a mixture of 0.04 M boric acid, 0.04 M phosphoric acid and 0.04 M acetic acid that has been titrated to the desired pH with 0.2 M sodium hydroxide. Britton and Robinson also proposed a second formulation that gave an essentially linear pH response to added alkali from pH 2.5 to pH 9.2 (and buffers to pH 12). This mixture consists of 0.0286 M citric acid, 0.0286 M monopotassium phosphate, 0.0286 M boric acid, 0.0286 M veronal and 0.0286 M hydrochloric acid titrated with 0.2 M sodium hydroxide.

This buffer was invented in 1931 by the English chemist Hubert Thomas Stanley "Kevin" Britton (1892–1960) and the New Zealand chemist Robert Anthony Robinson (1904–1979).

See also
 Buffer solution
 Good's buffers

References

 Britton, H. T. K. and R. A. Robinson. J. Chem. Soc., 1931, 1456–1462.
 Mongay Fernández, C. and V. Cerdá Martin Talanta, 1977, 24(12), 747–748.

Acid–base chemistry
Buffer solutions
Chemical tests